The Swinger from Rio is a 1966 album by Sérgio Mendes.  Recorded over three days in December 1964 for the Atlantic label, it features guest artists Phil Woods, Art Farmer, and Hubert Laws, plus Antônio Carlos Jobim on rhythm guitar.  It has also been released under the title Bossa Nova York.

Track listing
"Maria Moita" (Carlos Lyra, Vinicius de Moraes) 
"Sambinha Bossa Nova (Só Tinha De Ser Com Você)" (Antônio Carlos Jobim, Aloysio de Oliveira)
"Batida Diferente" (Durval Ferreira, Maurício Einhorn)
"Só Danço Samba" (Antônio Carlos Jobim, Vinicius de Moraes)
"Pau Brazil" (Sérgio Mendes)
"Garota de Ipanema" (Antônio Carlos Jobim, Vinicius de Moraes)
"Useless Panorama" (Antônio Carlos Jobim)
"The Dreamer (Vivo Sonhando)" (Antônio Carlos Jobim, Gene Lees)
"Primavera" (Carlos Lyra)
"Consolação" (Baden Powell)
"Favela" (Antônio Carlos Jobim)

Personnel
Sérgio Mendes - piano
Art Farmer - flugelhorn (tracks 2, 6, 7) (recorded 7 December 1964)
Phil Woods - alto saxophone (tracks 1, 4, 8) (recorded 8 December 1964)
Hubert Laws - flute (tracks 3, 5, 9, 11) (recorded 9 December 1964)
Antônio Carlos Jobim - rhythm guitar
Tiao Neto - bass
Chico de Souza - drums
Tom Dowd - audio engineer

References

Sérgio Mendes albums
1966 albums
Albums produced by Nesuhi Ertegun
Atlantic Records albums